The War of the Volcanoes (Italian original title La guerra dei vulcani) is a 2012 documentary film directed by  detailing the filming of Roberto Rossellini's 1950 film Stromboli starring Ingrid Bergman and the 1950 film Volcano starring Anna Magnani.

External links 

2012 films
Italian documentary films
Documentary films about films
2012 documentary films